Asa Smith Bushnell I (September 16, 1834 – January 15, 1904) was an American Republican politician from Ohio. He served as the 40th governor of Ohio. Prior to becoming governor, he served as the president of the Warder, Bushnell and Glessner Company, which became one of four companies that merged to form International Harvester. Other roles in business included serving as president of the Springfield Gas Company and the First National Bank of Springfield.

Biography
Bushnell was born in Rome, New York and moved to Springfield, Ohio at age 17. During the American Civil War, he raised a company of men for the 152nd Ohio Infantry, a 100 days regiment, and served as captain from May to September 1864. He was a Presidential elector in 1884 for Blaine/Logan. A business executive, Bushnell served as the Ohio State Republican Party Chair in 1885. He succeeded William McKinley as governor, serving two two-year terms from 1896 to 1900.

Valentine Anti-Trust Act
During the Bushnell administration, Ohio took an early leadership role in trust-busting. The Valentine Anti-Trust Act was signed into law by Bushnell.  This Act prohibited price fixing, and production limitation. All of these practices helped businesses by driving up the prices for their products, thus harming the consumer.  In addition to Valentine Anti-Trust Act, Bushnell's attorney general pursued the monopolistic practices of the Standard Oil Company in the courts.  Eventually, U.S. Senator John Sherman of Ohio introduced the Sherman Antitrust Act in the United States Congress in 1890. This law served as the first serious attempt by the federal government to break up monopolies and trusts, though successful enforcement of anti-trust laws was still more than a decade, and new political commitment, away.

Death
Bushnell came from his home at Springfield in January 1904 to attend the inauguration of Governor Myron T. Herrick at Columbus. After the ceremony, he entered his carriage to return home, was struck with apoplexy before reaching the railroad station, and died at a Columbus hospital four days later. He was buried in the Ferncliff Cemetery, Springfield on January 18, 1904.

Family
Bushnell married Ellen Ludlow of Springfield, September 17, 1857. They had two daughters and a son. He was a member of the Masons, the Grand Army of the Republic, and the Episcopal Church

Residence
 
Bushnell and his wife built a Richardson Romanesque mansion in Springfield, Ohio.  The house was not designed by Henry Hobson Richardson, but by Richardson’s firm soon after the architect's death.  Both of Bushnell's business partners, Benjamin Head Warder and John Glessner, had earlier hired Richardson to design their houses: the Warder Mansion in Washington, DC, and the John J. Glessner House in Chicago. Glessner's house is considered one of Richardson's greatest designs.

The Bushnell House is part of Springfield's East High Street Historic District, which is on the National Register of Historic Places.

References

External links
 
 ohiohistorycentral.org on the life of Asa Bushnell
 

1834 births
1904 deaths
Republican Party governors of Ohio
1884 United States presidential electors
People of Ohio in the American Civil War
Union Army officers
Politicians from Rome, New York
Politicians from Springfield, Ohio
19th-century American politicians
Springfield, Ohio